Herbert L. Bowman (21 April 1897 – April 1980) was an American tennis player in the early 20th century. In grand slam tournaments his best result came at the 1922 U.S. National Championships where he reached the fourth round before losing to Vinnie Richards. He played in over 100 tournaments, and 222 matches in singles between 1915 to 1946, and won 36 career titles.

Career
Bowman was born in New York, New York, Bowman took his bachelor's degree at Cornell University in 1919. While at Cornell, he joined the Phi Kappa Psi Fraternity in 1915, and through that affiliation, was a member of the Irving Literary Society.

Bowman played his first tournament at the 1915 U.S. National Championships. In 1921 he won his first title at the Quaker Ridge Invitation held at New Rochelle, New York City. He continued to play at the U.S. National Championships (todays U.S. Open) multiple times, with his best result coming at the 1922 U.S. National Championships, where he reached the fourth round, but was beaten by Vinnie Richards.

Bowman was ranked as high as No. 13 in the United States. In 1929, he won the singles and doubles titles at the Tri-State Tennis Championships today known as the Cincinnati Masters. He was 32 years old when he won the singles title, making him to this day the fourth oldest player to win the title in Cincinnati, behind Bill Tilden (who was 33 when he won in 1926), Andre Agassi (34 when he won his third Cincinnati title in 2004) and Ken Rosewall (35 when he won in 1970). In 1943 he won his final title at the Seventh Regiment Tennis Club tournament. In 1946 Bowman played his final tournament at the U.S. International Indoor Championships.

His career highlights included winning the New Jersey State Championships five times (1922, 1925–1927, 1930). He won the Bermuda Championships at Hamiltion on hard courts five times (1924, 1926, 1928–1930), the Quaker Ridge Invitation three times (1921, 1924, 1927), the New York State Championships two times (1922–1923), the Eastern Clay Court Championships two times (1929–1930), the Brooklyn Indoor (1923), the Long Island Indoor (1924), the Maryland State Championhips (1922), the Atlantic Coast Championships (1927), Hudson Valley Championship (1929) and the Old Dominion Championship (1936) in Richmond, Virginia.

Bowman died in New York City in 1980 at he age of 83.

References

External links
 

1897 births
1980 deaths
American male tennis players
Sportspeople from New York City
Tennis people from New York (state)
Date of death missing